Education in Jammu and Kashmir is based on 5-tier model which includes primary schools, middle schools, higher secondary schools, Colleges and University.  As per the census of 2011, Jammu and Kashmir has the literacy rate of 68%. However, there has been an increase in the numbers in recent years.

History 
The modern education system was introduced in Kashmir in the second half of the 19th century by Christian missionaries. Maharaja Ranbir Singh's School was the only school run by the state in 1874. In 1880, J.H. Knowles opened the first missionary school was opened in Srinagar.

Higher Education

Universities
There are two central universities and nine state universities in the Jammu and Kashmir.

References 

Education in Jammu and Kashmir